The 1996–97 Washington Huskies men's basketball team represented the University of Washington for the 1996–97 NCAA Division I men's basketball season. Led by fourth-year head coach Bob Bender, the Huskies were members of the Pacific-10 Conference and played their home games on campus at Hec Edmundson Pavilion in Seattle, Washington.

There was no conference tournament this season; last played in 1990, it resumed in 2002.

Washington played in the National Invitation Tournament for the second straight year and lost by four points at Nebraska.

Postseason result

|-
!colspan=6 style=| National Invitation Tournament

References

External links
Sports Reference – Washington Huskies: 1996–97 basketball season

Washington Huskies men's basketball seasons
Washington Huskies
Washington Huskies
Washington
Washington